Berberosaurus (meaning "Berber lizard", in reference to the Berbers of Morocco) is a genus of neotheropod dinosaur, possibly a ceratosaur, from the Early Toarcian-age (Lower Jurassic) Azilal Formation found in the High Atlas of Toundoute, Ouarzazate, Morocco. The type species of the genus Berberosaurus is B. liassicus, in reference to the Lias epoch. Berberosaurus might be the oldest known ceratosaur, and is based on partial postcranial remains.

Classification
Ronan Allain and colleagues, who described Berberosaurus, performed a phylogenetic analysis and found their new genus to be the most basal known abelisauroid, more derived than Elaphrosaurus, Ceratosaurus, and Spinostropheus, but less so than Xenotarsosaurus and abelisaurians. Berberosaurus is distinguished from other theropods by anatomical details found in its vertebrae, metacarpals, and hindlimb bones. Its assignment as an abelisauroid pushes back the record of this group and shows that it had diversified by the Early Jurassic. However, Carrano and Sampson (2008) found it to be a basal ceratosaur outside Neoceratosauria instead. Subsequently, the analysis of Xu et al. (2009) recovered it as a dilophosaurid in unresolved polytomy with Dilophosaurus wetherilli, "Dilophosaurus" sinensis, Dracovenator and Cryolophosaurus. The phylogenetic analysis performed by Ezcurra, Agnolin and Novas (2010) recovered Berberosaurus in unresolved polytomy with Ceratosaurus and Abelisauroidea, while the 2018 description of the basal ceratosaur Saltriovenator places Berberosaurus as the sister taxon to that genus. Same year, a paper found Berberosaurus in different positions: considered as a basal ceratosaurian, a neoceratosaurian or a basal abelisauroid. The paper which described Berberosaurus was the last one to find a monophyletic Ceratosauria that contained both Coelophysoids and Neoceratosaurs, most papers have since excluded Coelophysoidea from Ceratosauria and instead have favored the idea that Tetanurae and Ceratosauria are both part of a monophyletic group called Averostra, a classification which was already gaining popularity at around that time.

Discovery and history
The remains of Berberosaurus were discovered during a series of expeditions to the High Atlas beginning in the early 2000s. It is based on an associated partial postcranial skeleton of a subadult individual cataloged in the Muséum d'Histoire Naturelle de Marrakech; bones from this skeleton include a neck vertebra, part of the sacrum, a metacarpal, a femur, and parts of a tibia and both fibulae. Part of another femur has been assigned to the genus as well. Its remains were found alongside those of Tazoudasaurus and an indeterminate theropod within bone beds in mudflow deposits. Later tectonic activity has affected the bones.

Paleoecology and paleobiology
Berberosaurus, like other ceratosaurians, was a bipedal carnivore. Its remains were found with those of the early sauropod Tazoudasaurus. Also from the Early Jurassic of the High Atlas, but from another formation, are the fossils of another, smaller theropod (currently in preparation).

See also

 Timeline of ceratosaur research

References

Abelisaurs
Early Jurassic dinosaurs of Africa
Jurassic Morocco
Fossils of Morocco
Fossil taxa described in 2007
Taxa named by Dale Russell
Taxa named by Philippe Taquet